Muhammad Sadiq is a Punjabi-language singer, actor and politician from Punjab, India. He is best known for his duets with singer Ranjit Kaur. He is the current Member of Parliament, Lok Sabha for Faridkot, Punjab constituency. He was the Congress party MLA from Bhadaur in Punjab from 2012 to 2017.

Early life

Sadiq was born in 1939 in a Punjabi Muslim family, to father Walayat Ali and mother Parsinni, in the village of Kup Kalan (now Sangrur district) in British Punjab. According to him he belongs to Doom caste (a Marasi sub-caste). His uncle was a folk singer who inspired him a lot.

Career
He has sung with many female singers of Punjab including Surinder Kaur, Narinder Biba, Rajinder Rajan, Swaran Lata & many others including a duo with Ranjit Kaur. Most of his songs been written by famous Punjabi folk lyricist Babu Singh Maan. In his starting career he sang songs written by Inderjeet Hasanpuri & his friend Didar Sandhu. 
He recorded most of his songs & live performances with Ranjit Kaur for approximately 40 years. They were one of the most famous singing couples of Punjab in the 1970s and '80s. He first sang the famous folk song "Nigah Maarda Aayin Ve Mera Laung Gawacha" as duet with Bibi Surinder Kaur in late 60s written by lyricist Babu Singh Maan. Many of Punjabi singers have re-recorded his songs such as Na De Dil Pardesi Nu, Lammi Seeti Maar Mittra, Mera Laung Gawacha and Boliyaan.
He also acted in few Punjabi films like Putt Jattan De, Guddo, Patola, Jatt Jeona Morh and Tabaahi.

Politics
He contested from Bhadaur constituency in 2012 assembly elections as candidate of Congress and won defeating Darbara Singh Guru of Shiromani Akali Dal. His election was challenged by the defeated Akali candidate Guru on the grounds that he is a Muslim and thus does not belong to a scheduled caste making him ineligible to contest from a reserved seat. While the Punjab and Haryana High Court quashed his election, the Supreme Court, on his appeal, has stayed the HC order. In 2017 assembly elections, he contested from Jaito constituency as candidate of Congress and lost against Master Baldev Singh of Aam Aadmi Party.

Family
He has six daughters, all of them married. He has 5 grandsons and 3 granddaughters.

Muhammad considers himself a Sikh as his father would sing kirtan in Gurdwara and he was brought up in the Sikh faith.

Filmography
 Kulli Yaar Di (1970) ...
 Saidan Jogan (1979) ... Goga
 Rano ... Kanwar Harphool Singh
 Putt Jattan De (1983) ... Jabar Jang Singh
 Guddo (1985) ... Mangal/Jawala (Double Role)
 Patola (1988) ... Kishna Kautki
 Jatt Jeona Mour (1991) ... Daaku Chatraa
 Zakhmi (1996) ... Thanedaar Rachhpal Singh
 Tabaahi (1996) ... Thanedaar Seva Singh 
 Laali (1998) 
 Kaun Kise Da Beli (2007) ... Sohan
 Jatt Boys - Putt Jattan De (2013) ... Jassa
 Dulla Vaily (2019) ... Gheela

Famous songs
Baggi Titri Kamaadon Nikli
Mitran di Khang wich Khang Balliye
Aa Mundey Ve Zara Beh Mundeya
Na De Dil Pardesi Nu (Remixed by Panjabi MC as "Jogi")
100 da note
Mera Laung Gawacha
Haase Naal Si Chalawan Phull Mareya
Je Mundeya Teri Akh Ve Dukhdi
Khich Lai Vairiya
Kurti Malmal Di
Lammi Seeti Maar Mittra
La La Hogayi (Sucha Soorma)
Jatti Mili Jatt Nu
Solvin ch Deor Parda
Patt ditti Gutt
Malki Keema
Yaar Bimar Peya
Saari Saari Raat Pardi
Aavan gi jaror Mitra
Telu Raam di Hatti da Zarda
Mukk gayi Feem
Billo Teri Hikk
Roadways di Laari
Sohreya da Pind
Umar Munde di Niani

See also
 Didar Sandhu
 Babu Singh Maan
 Surinder Shinda
 Gurmel Singh Dhillon
 Kuldeep Manak
 Amar Singh Chamkila
 Gurcharan Pohli

References

 

Punjabi-language singers
Male actors in Punjabi cinema
Punjabi people
Living people
1942 births
People from Ludhiana district
20th-century Indian male actors
21st-century Indian male actors
Singers from Punjab, India
Male actors from Punjab, India
Indian National Congress politicians